Thomas Foley, 2nd Baron Foley (24 June 1742 – 2 July 1793) of Witley Court in Worcestershire, was a British peer and politician who sat in the House of Commons from 1767 to 1777 when he was raised to the peerage.

Early life
Foley was the eldest son of Thomas Foley, 1st Baron Foley, and was born on 24 June 1742. He was educated at Westminster School from 1753 and matriculated at Magdelen College, Oxford, in 1759.

Political career
 
Foley was returned unopposed as Member of Parliament for Herefordshire at a by-election on 18 May 1767 and retained his seat at the 1768 general election. At the 1774 general election he was returned as MP for the family borough of Droitwich until he succeeded to his father's peerage in 1777. Foley was a close friend of Charles James Fox, and was a gambler. Mrs Delany a society gossip, wrote in 1773  "Mr. T. Foley has lost at Newmarket etc. fifty thousand pounds. He has now entered into an agreement with his father, that if he will pay his debts he will entirely leave off gambling." In November 1775 George Selwyn wrote "Old Foley pays another £70,000 of debt, and settles, I hear today, £4,000 in present upon his son, and £6,000 a year more at his death." Foley married Lady Harriet Stanhope, daughter of William Stanhope, 2nd Earl of Harrington, on 20 March 1776. He was appointed joint Postmaster-General in 1783 for nine months.

Inheritance 
The family estate at Stoke Edith had been entailed to Foley under his parents' marriage settlement, but both he and his next brother, Edward, were profligate spenders. When his father paid Foley's debts in 1773 (mortgaging his estates), this Thomas conveyed his interest in the Stoke Edith estate to his father. The father had also inherited, in 1766, the Great Witley estate from his cousin, the 2nd Lord Foley of the first creation. This enabled the father (in his will) to divide his estates between his three sons.

Thomas' share was the extensive Great Witley estate, but excluding the manor of Malvern and estates that his cousin had bought from Lord Montfort (which were included in Edward's share). However, this Thomas did not immediately become entitled to the estates, but only to an annuity. The balance of the income was applied to paying his debts. After his death in 1793, there were still unpaid debts, which the creditors exchanged for annuities terminating in 1808. By that time, his own son, also named Thomas, had come of age. In the meantime it had been necessary to obtain two private Acts of Parliament (in 1778 and 1796) to enable the trustees to make sales of parts of the estates, grant leases, and otherwise deal with the settled estate.

Later years
Thomas Foley was known to his contemporaries as "Lord Balloon", because of his girth. He was a friend of architect John Nash. He died on 2 July 1793. After Foley's death, his son Thomas commissioned Nash to add porticoes to the north and south sides of Witley Court.

References 

1742 births
1793 deaths
People from Malvern Hills District
People educated at Westminster School, London
Alumni of Magdalen College, Oxford
Members of the Parliament of Great Britain for English constituencies
British MPs 1761–1768
British MPs 1768–1774
British MPs 1774–1780
Thomas
2
Politicians from Worcestershire